Nucet may refer to several places in Romania:

Nucet, a town in Bihor County
Nucet, Dâmbovița, a commune in Dâmbovița County
Nucet, a village in Chiojdeanca Commune, Prahova County
Nucet, a village in Gornet Commune, Prahova County
Nucet, a village in Roșia Commune, Sibiu County
 Nucet, a tributary of the Ialomița in Dâmbovița County